Sindh Qalanders is the domestic field hockey team for the Sindh in Pakistan. It is part of the Pakistan Hockey Federation.

References 

Pakistani field hockey clubs
Sport in Sindh